The 1959–60 season was Colchester United's 18th season in their history and their tenth season in the third tier of English football, the Third Division. Alongside competing in the Third Division, the club also participated in the FA Cup, with Colchester being knocked out by league rivals Queens Park Rangers in the first round. Colchester ended the season in ninth place in the Third Division.

Season overview
Colchester's first game under floodlights at Layer Road was on 24 August 1959 when 9,689 watched the 2–2 draw with Grimsby Town. The ground became somewhat of a fortress, losing only twice throughout the campaign. However, Colchester struggled on their travels, earning just three wins. The mixed form led to a ninth position finish in the Third Division table.

The most notable bonus for the season was Martyn King's completion of national service meaning he was available for every game. Playing in 40 matches, forward King equalled Kevin McCurley's club record of 30 Football League goals in a season which included a trio of hat-tricks.

Players

Transfers

In

Out

Match details

Third Division

Results round by round

League table

Matches

FA Cup

Squad statistics

Appearances and goals

|-
!colspan="14"|Players who appeared for Colchester who left during the season

|}

Goalscorers

Clean sheets
Number of games goalkeepers kept a clean sheet.

Player debuts
Players making their first-team Colchester United debut in a fully competitive match.

See also
List of Colchester United F.C. seasons

References

General
Books

Websites

Specific

1959-60
English football clubs 1959–60 season